The 1991 Norstar Bank Hamlet Challenge Cup was a men's tennis tournament played on outdoor hard courts. It was the 11th edition of the event known that year as the Norstar Bank Hamlet Challenge Cup, and was part of the World Series of the 1991 ATP Tour. It took place at the Hamlet Golf and Country Club in Commack, Long Island, New York, United States, from August 19 through August 25, 1991.

The singles featured ATP No. 2, Australian Open and Wimbledon semifinalist, Stuttgart, Tokyo indoor and Queen's Club winner, Long Island defending champion Stefan Edberg, Australian Open runner-up, Philadelphia and Memphis champion Ivan Lendl, and Wimbledon semifinalist, Miami finalist David Wheaton. Also present were Chicago titlist John McEnroe, Manchester winner Goran Ivanišević, Jonas Svensson, Alberto Mancini and Omar Camporese.

Second-seeded Ivan Lendl, who entered the draw on a wildcard, won the singles title and earned $32,400 first-prize money. It was his 5th win at the event, the first with the event as part of the ATP circuit.

Finals

Singles

 Ivan Lendl defeated  Stefan Edberg, 6–3, 6–2
 It was Lendl's 3rd and final singles title of the year and the 91st of his career.

Doubles

 Eric Jelen /  Carl-Uwe Steeb defeated  Doug Flach /  Diego Nargiso, 0–6, 6–4, 7–6
 It was Jelen's 1st doubles title of the year and the 4th of his career. It was Steeb's 1st doubles title of the year and the 2nd of his career.

See also
 Edberg–Lendl rivalry

References

External links
 ITF tournament edition details

 
Norstar Bank Hamlet Challenge Cup
1991
Norstar Bank Hamlet Challenge Cup
Norstar Bank Hamlet Challenge Cup